Ryan Lomberg (born December 9, 1994) is a Canadian professional ice hockey left winger currently playing for the Florida Panthers of the National Hockey League (NHL).

Playing career

Junior
A native of Richmond Hill, Ontario, Lomberg began his junior hockey career in the Ontario Junior Hockey League (OJHL), playing bit roles in parts of two seasons with the North York Rangers and the Upper Canada Patriots in 2009–10 and 2010–11. From there, he moved on to play for the Muskegon Lumberjacks of the United States Hockey League (USHL) in the 2011–12 season, emerging as the team's offensive leader with 40 points in 52 games, while adding 154 penalty minutes – enough for fifth in the league.

Attending the University of Maine beginning with the 2012–13 school year, Lomberg played for the Maine Black Bears for two seasons, accumulating 18 goals and 14 assists over 66 games with the team. However, following the 2013–14 season, Lomberg left the school after being suspended from the Black Bears due to an assault and disorderly conduct charge, the latter of which he pleaded guilty to.

Looking to get his hockey career back on track, Lomberg returned to the USHL for the 2014–15 season with the Youngstown Phantoms. Lomberg scored 24 goals and 43 points in the regular season while playing with future Winnipeg Jets forward Kyle Connor and serving as team captain to help lead the Phantoms to the Anderson Cup.

Lomberg's play with the Phantoms caught the eye of the Calgary Flames' amateur scouting staff, earning him an invite to their annual fall development camp. Lomberg impressed enough to earn a minor-league deal with the Stockton Heat, Calgary's AHL affiliate. The deal was announced in the wake of speculation that Lomberg would join Miami University's men's hockey team on a transfer from the University of Maine.

Professional 
Lomberg split his first professional season between the Heat and their ECHL affiliate, the Adirondack Thunder. Scoring at nearly a point-per-game pace with the Thunder, Lomberg earned extended time with the Heat throughout the system, going goalless with 3 assists and 42 penalty minutes in 15 AHL games during the 2015–16 AHL season.

Continuing with the Heat in 2016–17, Lomberg emerged as a more multi-dimensional player. In addition to his 127 penalty minutes, Lomberg scored 13 goals and 29 points in 68 games with the team, good for seventh and eighth on the team, respectively.

Impressed with his work ethic and determination, the Calgary Flames rewarded Lomberg with a two-year entry-level contract worth $710,000 per season in the NHL on March 17, 2017. The deal came into effect at the beginning of the 2017–18 NHL season.

Looking to inject some energy into the lineup and forced to deal with the absence of Jaromír Jágr, the Flames recalled Lomberg on January 14, 2018. He made his NHL debut eleven days later, on January 25, against the Edmonton Oilers. During the game, he fought the Oilers' Zack Kassian, and recorded 6:30 of total playing time.

After five seasons within the Flames organization, Lomberg left as a free agent to sign a two-year, $1.45 million contract with the Florida Panthers on October 9, 2020. He played 34 games for the Panthers during the 2020–21 season, recording two goals and two assists in 34 games. On November 26, 2021, the Panthers re-signed Lomberg to a two-year contract extension.

Career statistics

References

External links 

1994 births
Living people
Adirondack Thunder players
Calgary Flames players
Canadian ice hockey left wingers
Florida Panthers players
Ice hockey people from Ontario
Muskegon Lumberjacks players
Sportspeople from Richmond Hill, Ontario
Stockton Heat players
Undrafted National Hockey League players
Youngstown Phantoms players